Frank Theodore Levine (born May 29, 1957) is an American actor. He is best known for playing the roles of Buffalo Bill in the film The Silence of the Lambs (1991) and Leland Stottlemeyer in the television series Monk (2002–2009).

Levine's other notable roles were in the films Nowhere to Run (1993), Heat (1995), Bullet (1996), The Fast and the Furious (2001), The Manchurian Candidate (2004), Memoirs of a Geisha (2005), American Gangster (2007), Shutter Island (2010), Jurassic World: Fallen Kingdom (2018), and The Report (2019).

Early life
Levine was born in Bellaire, Ohio, the son of Charlotte Virginia (Clark) and Milton Dmitri Levine, who were both doctors and members of Physicians for Social Responsibility. Levine's father was of Russian-Jewish descent and his mother had Welsh and Native American ancestry. He describes himself as a "hillbilly Jew." He grew up in Oak Park, Illinois. In 1975, he enrolled at Marlboro College.

Career
He became a fixture in the Chicago theatre scene and joined the Remains Theatre which was co-founded by Gary Cole and William Petersen. After his stage experience, Levine began to devote most of his energy during the 1980s toward finding roles in film and television. One of his most prominent roles in the 1980s was playing mob enforcer Frank Holman in the NBC drama Crime Story (1986–88).

After his breakout role in The Silence of the Lambs (as primary antagonist Buffalo Bill), there was a period where he was typecast in villainous roles. Levine was able to gradually branch out into other types of roles such as a member of Al Pacino's police unit in Heat and astronaut Alan Shepard in the HBO mini-series From the Earth to the Moon. In the drama Georgia, he played Mare Winningham's husband, one of his most sympathetic roles.

In 2001, Levine performed as Paul Walker's police superior Sergeant Tanner in The Fast and the Furious. His résumé also includes an uncredited role as the voice of the sociopathic trucker "Rusty Nail" in Joy Ride, also starring Walker.

He played Detective Sam Nico in the 2003 film Wonderland, based on the gruesome murders in the Hollywood Hills.

From 2002 to 2009, he co-starred as Captain Leland Stottlemeyer on USA Network's detective series Monk, starring Tony Shalhoub.

Levine provided the voice of the supervillain Sinestro in Superman: The Animated Series, Static Shock, Justice League, and Justice League Unlimited, all part of the DC Animated Universe.

Levine also appeared as a patriarch whose family takes a turn for the worse in the remake of The Hills Have Eyes (2006).

In 2007, he portrayed local Sheriff James Timberlake in The Assassination of Jesse James by the Coward Robert Ford and appeared in Ridley Scott's American Gangster, alongside Denzel Washington and Russell Crowe.

In 2010, he appeared as the warden of the island prison in Shutter Island, starring Leonardo DiCaprio.

In 2012, he appeared as Sheriff Bloom Towne in Deep Dark Canyon, alongside Spencer Treat Clark and Nick Eversman, who portray Sheriff Towne's sons, Nate and Skylar, respectively.

In 2013, he had a major supporting role in the FX murder mystery series The Bridge as Lieutenant Hank Wade, commander of a police homicide unit in a Texas border city.

In 2014 he portrayed General Underwood in the British-Finnish action film Big Game.

In 2018, Levine co-starred in the sequel Jurassic World: Fallen Kingdom, as hunter Ken Wheatley.

From 2018 to 2020, he played Thomas F. Byrnes on the TNT series The Alienist.

In 2021, he joined the cast of the ABC drama Big Sky, playing the role of Horst Kleinsasser.

Personal life
Levine is married to Kim Phillips, and they have two children.

Filmography

Film

Television

Awards and nominations

References

External links
 
 

1957 births
20th-century American male actors
21st-century American male actors
American male film actors
American male television actors
American people who self-identify as being of Native American descent
American people of Russian-Jewish descent
American people of Welsh descent
Jewish American male actors
Living people
Male actors from Chicago
Male Western (genre) film actors
Marlboro College alumni
People from Bellaire, Ohio
University of Chicago alumni
21st-century American Jews